The Suspended Step of the Stork (translit. To Meteoro Vima Tou Pelargou) is a 1991 Greek film directed by Theodoros Angelopoulos. It was entered into the 1991 Cannes Film Festival.

Cast
 Marcello Mastroianni as Missing Politician
 Jeanne Moreau as The Woman
 Gregory Patrikareas as Alexandre the Reporter (as Gregory Karr)
 Ilias Logothetis as Colonel
 Dora Hrisikou as The Girl
 Vassilis Bouyiouklakis as Production Manager
 Dimitris Poulikakos as Chief Photographer
 Gerasimos Skiadaressis as Waiter
 Tasos Apostolou as Perchman
 Akis Sakellariou as Sound Operator
 Athinodoros Prousalis as Hotel-keeper
 Mihalis Giannatos as Shopkeeper
 Christoforos Nezer as Parliament's President
 Yilmaz Hassan as Hanged Man
 Benjamin Ritter as Sound Operator

References

External links
 

1991 drama films
1991 films
Films directed by Theodoros Angelopoulos
1990s Greek-language films
Films with screenplays by Tonino Guerra
Films scored by Eleni Karaindrou
Films shot in Florina
Greek drama films